No Strings Attached is a 2011 American romantic comedy film directed and co-produced by Ivan Reitman. Starring Natalie Portman and Ashton Kutcher, the film is about two friends who decide to make a pact to have a "no strings attached" relationship, without falling in love with each other. The film was released in the United States on January 21, 2011.

Plot
After first meeting at a summer camp as teenagers, Emma Kurtzman and Adam Franklin run into each other a few times as young adults but never keep in touch. Emma is  a doctor in Los Angeles, and Adam is a production assistant for a musical television show.

Soon, Adam finds out that his father Alvin, the well-known star of a former hit television comedy series, has begun a romance with his ex-girlfriend, Vanessa. Devastated, a drunken Adam calls all his female contacts to hook up. The next morning, he wakes up on Emma's couch, with her friends and colleagues teasing and telling him that he was crying and passed out naked on the couch. She leads him to her room to find his pants, and they have sex.

They have sex again at Adam's house. Before Emma leaves, they agree to engage in a "no strings attached" relationship, where they just have sex. Soon, Adam finds himself getting jealous of Emma's co-worker Sam, and being an emotional person, he doubles his romantic attempts towards her. She feels awkward and thus ends their arrangement, only to end up missing him. She drunkenly crashes at his place, and they sleep together again.

On Adam's birthday, his father tells him he wishes to have children with Vanessa. Disgusted, Adam walks out, and Emma defends him. He asks her for one single date on Valentine's Day, and it seems perfect till she awkwardly tells him she will not engage in an emotional relationship. He says he can't continue without progressing, so they agree to not see each other.

Six weeks later, at her sister's wedding rehearsal dinner, Emma realizes she wants to be with Adam. She calls, saying that she misses him, but he shuts her down. She drives over to his place, only to see Adam and his colleague Lucy, who she thinks is his girlfriend, going inside together. She drives away, heartbroken.

Later that same night, Adam and Lucy are awkwardly starting to get intimate when Vanessa calls to tell him his father is in the hospital. Adam rushes to the hospital, only to see Emma there as well, as her colleague Shira had informed her.

As Emma confesses her feelings to Adam, he asks her to pursue their relationship again, and she agrees. They have breakfast together, a sign of a "strings attached" relationship, and arrive in time for her sister's wedding.

Cast

In addition, Ivan Reitman makes a cameo as a musical television show director.

Production
No Strings Attached is directed by Ivan Reitman based on a screenplay by Elizabeth Meriwether titled Friends with Benefits. The title was changed to avoid confusion with a different film with a similar premise that opened on July 22, 2011. The Paramount Pictures film was first announced in March 2010 as an untitled project. Reitman said of casual sex, "I noticed from my own kids that with this generation in particular, young people find it easier to have a sexual relationship than an emotional one. That is how the sexes deal with each other today." Principal photography began in May 2010.

Though the timing was coincidental, Portman welcomed the chance to portray a dissimilar character to her role in Black Swan.

Soundtrack 

No Strings Attached: Music from the Motion Picture is the soundtrack to the film. It was released on February 15, 2011, by Lakeshore Records.

Release
Its target demographic was women between 17 and 24 years old, and its primary competition was The Dilemma. Interest tracking reflected the target demographic's gaining interest in the film leading up to its release, and tracking also revealed "good early awareness" from Hispanic audiences. The studio predicted for the film to gross in the "mid-to-high teens" millions in its opening weekend, similar to past romantic comedies rated "R" (restricted to 17 years old and up) by the Motion Picture Association of America.

Box office

According to CinemaScore, audiences under the age of 25 gave the film an "A−" grade while audiences over the age of 25 gave it a "B" grade. Future grosses were expected to be dependent on the younger demographic.

Critical reception

No Strings Attached received mixed reviews. Review aggregator Rotten Tomatoes gives the film a rating of 48%, based on 173 reviews, with an average rating of 5.30/10. The site's consensus reads: "It benefits from the presence of Natalie Portman and director Ivan Reitman's steady hand, but No Strings Attached doesn't have the courage or conviction to follow through on its ribald premise." On Metacritic, the film received a score of 50 out of 100, based on 36 reviews, indicating "mixed or average reviews".

Critic David Edelstein described No Strings Attached as a film with "a supposedly feminist veneer...(that) never makes the case for Emma's point of view. It's almost a feminist backlash movie, and it didn't have to be. There are plenty of reasons for brilliant young women, especially with the stress of a medical career, to approach time- and emotion-consuming relationships warily." He expressed disappointment on overuse of stock characters, as well as Reitman's "heavy-handed" direction and a story that is ultimately "corny and contrived and conservative."  A. O. Scott called the film "not entirely terrible...high praise indeed, given that this is a film aspiring to match the achievement of 27 Dresses, When in Rome, and Leap Year"; according to Scott, the film is "Love & Other Drugs without the disease", a film whose pleasures "are to be found in the brisk, easy humor of some of Ms. Meriwether's dialogue and in the talented people scattered around Ms. Portman and Mr. Kutcher like fresh herbs strewn on a serving of overcooked fish."  Scott considered "the film's great squandered opportunity—and also the source of some of its best comic moments—is that Ms. Gerwig and Mindy Kaling in effect share the role of Emma’s zany sidekick.  How can this be? Why are these two entirely original and of-the-moment performers marginal players in this agreeable, lackluster picture and not stars of the year’s greatest girl-bromance?... To imagine Ms. Kaling and Ms. Gerwig in a remake of Thelma and Louise or the Wedding Crashers is to experience an equal measure of frustration and hope. Why can’t we have a few movies like that and not quite so many like this?"

British newspaper The Telegraph named No Strings Attached one of the ten worst films of 2011, saying "No Strings Attached is nominally a raunchy romantic comedy, but Natalie Portman betrays so little indication of enjoying herself you’d be forgiven for thinking we were watching deleted scenes from Black Swan."

Home media
No Strings Attached was released on DVD and Blu-ray on May 10, 2011.

See also
 Friends with Benefits
 When Harry Met Sally
 Befikre

References

External links

 
 
 
 
 

2011 films
2011 romantic comedy films
2010s sex comedy films
American romantic comedy films
American sex comedy films
Casual sex in films
Salary controversies in film
Casting controversies in film
DreamWorks Pictures films
2010s English-language films
Films directed by Ivan Reitman
Films scored by John Debney
Films set in Los Angeles
Films shot in Los Angeles
Paramount Pictures films
The Montecito Picture Company films
Spyglass Entertainment films
Films produced by Ivan Reitman
2010s American films